Maudeline Moryl (born 24 January 2003) is a Haitian footballer who plays as a defender for ASF Croix-des-Bouquets and the Haiti women's national team.

International career
Moryl has appeared for the Haiti women's national team, including in the 2020 CONCACAF Women's Olympic Qualifying Championship on 3 February 2020 against Panama. She came on as a substitute in the 82nd minute for Danielle Étienne, with the match finishing as a 6–0 win.

References

External links
 

2003 births
Living people
Haitian women's footballers
Haiti women's international footballers
Women's association football defenders
People from Cap-Haïtien